Protopresbyter Dimitrios Holevas (January 26, 1907 – July 16, 2001), more commonly known as Papa-Holevas (Παπαχολέβας, "Father Holevas"), was a Greek Orthodox priest who was a notable member of the Greek People's Liberation Army (ELAS), set up by the National Liberation Front (EAM), a leftist resistance movement against the Axis occupation of Greece during World War II.

Holevas was born on January 26, 1907, in Tsouka (a village in Phthiotis), and grew up in Makrakomi. He studied Literature and Archaeology at the University of Athens and the University of Thessaloniki. In 1938 he was ordained a priest. He joined ELAS in 1942, with the nom de guerre of "Papaflessas". He became military priest of ELAS' 13th Division, and later became a deputy in the EAM-sponsored parliament of the PEEA. In 1943, he organized a council of priests at Spercheiada. He also founded the Pan-clerical Orthodox Clergy Union, which came to number 4,000 members, and was elected as its General Secretary.

After the end of the war, he was persecuted for his support of ELAS: the Synodal Court suspended him from the clergy for three years, and in 1947 he was sent into internal exile in Ikaria. As a philologist and a priest he taught in schools in Lamia, Lavrion, Leros, Archangelos in Rhodes and Nikaia. In 2001 he was honoured by the Holy Synod of the Church of Greece with the Gold Cross of St Paul for his activity during the Resistance.

He died on 16 July 2001. He was married and had five children.

Sources
 
  
 

1907 births
2001 deaths
Greek Eastern Orthodox priests
National Liberation Front (Greece) members
People from Makrakomi
20th-century Eastern Orthodox priests
Greek People's Liberation Army personnel